Gunter Segers is a Belgian children's book author, Belgian non-fiction book author, graphic designer and illustrator.

Published picture books
 "Flappie waar komen de kindjes vandaan?" (1993)
 "Een sneeuwman met een plan" ("Snowman with a plan", 2004)°
 "Sneeuwman gaat op reis" ("Snowman goes travelling", 2005)°
 "Sneeuwman in de lucht' ('Snowman in the air", 2005)°
 "Een dagje vrij voor klein konijn" ("Little Rabbit's day-off", illustraties van Heidi D'hamers, 2005)°
 "Een grote vriend voor klein konijn" ("Little Rabbit's big friend", illustraties van Heidi D'hamers, 2006)°
 "Klein Konijn en de wonderwortel" ("Little Rabbit and the amazing carrot", illustraties van Heidi D'hamers, 2007)°
 "Klein Konijn en de Rommelbeer" (illustraties van Heidi D'hamers, 2008)°
 "Max de muis ontdekt de stad" (Standaard/Technopolis, tekst van Annemie Bosmans, 2007)
 "De Groene IJsbeer" (Lannoo/Djapo, tekst van Wouter Thielemans, 2012)
 "De Scharlaken Pompelmoes" (Lannoo/Djapo, tekst van Wouter Thielemans, 2013)
 "Gloob & Teo: Feest in het bos" (Les Iles/ Djapo 2014)
 "Gloob & Teo en het Zeemonster" (Les Iles/ Djapo 2014)
 "Het grote avontuur van Billy en Bonnie" (Les Iles/ Djapo 2014)
 "Op stap met Didier" (Les Iles / 2015)
 "Gloob & Teo: Bloem" (Les Iles/ Djapo 2016)
 "Gloob & Teo: In de wolken" (Les Iles/ Djapo 2016)
 "België" (Lannoo 2016)
 "Gloob & Teo: Spetterpret" (Les Iles/ Djapo 2017)
 "Gloob & Teo: (h)eerlijke Bananentaart" (Les Iles/ Djapo 2017)
 "Gloob & Teo's Verhalenboek" (Les Iles/ Djapo 2017)
 "Sinterklaas boekengeschenk" (bPost / 2015, 2016, 2017, 2020, 2021)
 "Sinterklaas Zoekboek" (ZNU 2018)
 "Terug naar school Zoekboek" (ZNU 2019)
 "Beer op de bank" (Averbode, tekst van Evi Roovers, 2020)
 "Pas op kleine leeuw" (Averbode, tekst van Evi Roovers, 2020)
 "Een noot op je kop" (Averbode, tekst van Aag Vernelen, 2020)
 "Blijf wakker, Mot" (Averbode, tekst van Aag Vernelen, 2021)
 "Hier wordt gewerkt" (Pelckmans/Etwie 2021)

° Books have been translated and published in South Korea, France, Japan, Taiwan, China, Austria, Germany, ...

Non-fiction books
 "Hélène Dutrieu, de vrouw die door de Olympia vloog" (Les Iles / 2021)

Collaborator (illustrations, lay-out, design) for the highly acclaimed animated short 'Rumours' ('Geruchten') by director Frits Standaert .

Contributed to The Residents DVD The Commercial Album, released in 2004). 

Art-Director at Les Iles publishers

External links
 gunter segers
 les iles publishers
 helene dutrieu
 lannoo
 belgie-book
 rumours

1968 births
Living people
Belgian children's writers
Belgian graphic designers
Flemish writers